Underwater World, also known as Underwater World Singapore Pte Ltd, was an oceanarium located on the offshore Singaporean island of Sentosa. It was opened on 13 May 1991 and closed on 26 June 2016.

History
The oceanarium was developed by the Western Australian Development Corporation in the late 1980s. It opened to the public on 13 May 1991 and was sold to private investors a year later. It had more than 2,500 marine animals of 250 species from different regions of the world. The oceanarium was mostly underground and it was owned by the Haw Par Corporation. The Underwater World's ticket included admission to the Dolphin Lagoon at Palawan Beach. It re-opened on 23 February 2010 after a revamp of several attractions within the park.

Underwater World was also involved in several environmental and educational projects, such as the Living in the Ocean Programme, Ocean Ambassador Programme and the Coral Club. The Underwater World also provided exclusive venues to host events, such as ocean-themed functions.

Attractions

Adventures
The Underwater World and Dolphin Lagoon offered numerous adventures to the visitors. Some of them included:
Marine Discovery
Dive With the Sharks
Swim With the Dolphins

Dolphin Lagoon

The Dolphin Lagoon was home to several Indo-Pacific humpback dolphins, also known as the "pink dolphins". Several "Meet-the-Dolphins" sessions were held daily that allowed visitors to enter the waist-deep pool and interact closely with the dolphins. The ticket to the Underwater World & dolphin show did not include the direct contact with the dolphins, an additional photo-coupon had to be purchased. The lagoon also included a Dolphin Suite where visitors could watch the dolphin performance from within an air-conditioned area.

In August 2014 the organizations Wildlife Watcher Singapore, in collaboration with Sea Shepherd Conservation Society, reported sub-standard living conditions for the animals.

The pink dolphins have since been rehoused in Chimelong Ocean Kingdom, an oceanarium in Zhuhai, China.

Effect of plans for Sentosa Integrated Resort
On 6 December 2006, Underwater World Singapore launched three new attractionsan interactive stingray feeding pool, a display of small marine reef species, and 'Fish Reflexology', Singapore's first fish reflexology spa, where two species of doctor fish gently nibble away at the dead skin on visitors' feet. The new features cost 650,000.

This was amid plans that were being proposed for Sentosa's Integrated Resorts. Genting Group's 5.2 billion proposal, Resorts World, would feature the world's largest oceanarium at that point in timethe  Quest Marine Life Parkwhich would house 700,000 marine animals in a  lagoon. A week later it was announced that Genting International won the bid. In 2012, the Marine Life Park (also known as S.E.A. Aquarium) opened in Resorts World Sentosa.

Closure
On 6 June 2016, it was announced by operator Haw Par that the venue would close on 26th of that month. Its pink dolphins, fur seals and otters had been transferred to Chimelong Ocean Kingdom in Zhuhai, China the week before the announcement.

List of animals in Underwater World and Dolphin Lagoon

Golden trevally
Bluespotted ribbontail ray
Indo-Pacific humpback dolphin
Coconut crab
Cownose ray
Dugong (Dugong dugon)
Moon jellyfish (Aurelia aurita)
Spider crab
Yellow tang
Sand tiger shark
Green sea turtle
Nibble fish
All kinds of reef fish
Pufferfish
Sea stars/starfishes
Chambered nautilus
Arapaima
Angel shark
Bannerfishes
Butterfly fishes
Rainbow crab
Vinegar crab
Box crabs
Decorator crab
Humphead wrasse
Shovelnose rays
Eagle rays
Nurse sharks
Bamboo sharks
Leafy seadragon
Weedy seadragon
Clown fishes
Sea anemones
Giant grouper
White-tip reef shark
Leopard shark
Lion's mane jellyfish
Blue jellyfish
Sea nettle

See also
Jurong Bird Park
Night Safari
Marine Life Park
Singapore Zoo
Van Kleef Aquarium

Transit
The Underwater World Monorail Station used to serve this attraction, but it no longer does since the station closed in 2005.

A 3 Cabin Beach shuttle ( Beach Tram ) Serve the Former attraction but little is known about it.

References

External links

Demolished buildings and structures in Singapore
1991 establishments in Singapore
Oceanaria
Sentosa
Southern Islands
2016 disestablishments in Singapore